Anthene kikuyu, the Kikuyu ciliate blue, is a butterfly in the family Lycaenidae. It is found in Mauritania, Ghana, Nigeria, Uganda, central and western Kenya and north-western Tanzania. The habitat consists of dry savanna.

Adults of both sexes are often attracted to the flowers of Acacia species.

The larvae feed on the young terminal shoots of Acacia lahai, Acacia stenocarpa and Dichrostachys species. They are associated with ants of the genus Crematogaster. The larvae are very dark green and very hairy.

References

Butterflies described in 1910
Anthene